The ITF Women's Circuit – Xi'an was a tournament for professional female tennis players played on outdoor hard courts. The event was classified as a $50,000 ITF Women's Circuit tournament and only held once in 2014.

Past finals

Singles

Doubles

External links 
 ITF search 

ITF Women's World Tennis Tour
Hard court tennis tournaments
Tennis tournaments in China